Gymnopilus humicola is a species of mushroom in the family Hymenogastraceae.

Description
The species is inedible.

Habitat and distribution
Gymnopilus humicola grows on humus, in both coniferous and deciduous woodland. It has been found in the US states of Michigan, Idaho, Tennessee, and Washington. It fruits from June to September.

See also

List of Gymnopilus species

References

External links
Gymnopilus humicola at Index Fungorum

humicola
Fungi of North America
Inedible fungi